Mochadion was a coastal town of ancient Bithynia located on the Bosphorus.

Its site is tentatively located near Fil Burnu in Asiatic Turkey.

References

Populated places in Bithynia
Former populated places in Turkey
History of Istanbul Province